Sgurra Bhreac (alternative spelling 'Sgurra Breac'), sometimes referred to as the Big Rock, is a Canadian peak in the East Bay Hills of Cape Breton Island, an extension of the Appalachian mountain chain in the province of Nova Scotia.

Location 
(named "Spring Road" on older maps) to the south or a road (unnamed on current topographical maps) to the north passing through Rear Big Pond, which follows the Breac Brook Valley. The final approach to the peak is by hiking.

Name 
Sgurra is a Gaelic term for “hill.” The form 'Sgurr' or 'Sgùrr na' is not uncommon as part of the name of a mountain in Scotland. In Canada, however, its usage in geographical names is rare and generally only found in the province of Nova Scotia where it is a generic term for hill. The name, Sgurra Bhreac, (pronunciation approximately "skoor ah brec") means spotted or pitted ridge or rock in Gaelic, speckled peak.

The name, Sgurra Bhreac, was officially adopted for the big rock on 2 December 1924.  The Sgurra Breac, a local history / natural sciences newsletter published from 2004 to 2010, had adopted the name of the "Big Rock".

Survey monument 
There is a first order Natural Resources Canada Geodetic Survey Division Station (Unique Number: 21139) on the summit, consisting of three markers. Two are brass/bronze disks and one is a copper survey bolt.  This station was established sometime before 1921 as a fourth order station, and upgraded to first order in 1969/1970.

Hiking / Geocaching 
Sgurra Bhreac is a challenging but popular hiking/geocaching destination as the view from its summit is impressive.  From here one can see Sydney, Glace Bay, the Bras d'Or Lake, the Mira River and most of the Mira area, Loch Lomond, the Atlantic Ocean, and many other lakes, ridges, valleys and bogs.

References

External links
 Nova Scotia Archives Library - Sgurra Breac.  Big Pond, N.S. : (s.n.), 2004- .ill. ; 28 cm.
 A 360° panoramic view from the summit of Sgurra Bhreac, date created, 6/11/2012

Mountains of Nova Scotia
Landforms of the Cape Breton Regional Municipality
Landforms of Cape Breton County
Mountains of Canada under 1000 metres